Teatr-e Shahr Metro Station is a station in Tehran Metro Line 4 and  Line 3. It is located at the intersection of Enghelab Street and Valiasr Street near the location of Teatr-e Shahr, in Daneshjoo Park. The station was formerly known as Vali Asr Metro Station. However, its name was officially changed on February 2, 2016, in order to avoid confusions with the newer Meydan-e Vali Asr Metro Station.

See also
City Theater of Tehran 
Tehran metro

References

Tehran Metro stations